Auguste Désiré Saint-Quentin (1838 in Valenciennes – 1906) was a French painter. Studying under Abel de Pujol, he painted the ceiling of the église Saint-Géry at Valenciennes and paintings for the église Saint-Martin at Sebourg in the Valenciennois, as well as working on the casket of Saint Drogo (also at the église Saint-Martin). The Musée des Beaux Arts de Tourcoing has a watercolour by him.

References 

1838 births
1906 deaths
People from Valenciennes
19th-century French painters
French male painters
20th-century French painters
20th-century French male artists
Date of birth missing
Date of death missing
19th-century French male artists